Acontias  tristis, the Namaqualand dwarf legless skink, is a species of lizard in the family Scincidae. It is endemic to South Africa.

References

Acontias
Reptiles described in 1910
Taxa named by Franz Werner